Barroilhet is a surname. Notable people with the surname include:

Gonzalo Barroilhet (born 1986), Chilean decathlete
Jordan Barroilhet (born 1998), French footballer 
Paul Barroilhet (1810–1871), French opera singer
Richard Barroilhet (born 1992), English-born French footballer